Cascades or The Cascades may refer to:

 Cascades, a series of waterfalls

Places

North America
 Cascades (ecoregion), which includes much of the mountain range
 Cascades (conservation area), a wildland in western Virginia
 Cascades, Virginia, a census-designated place
 Cascades Park (Tallahassee), a park in Florida
 Cascade Range or Cascades, a mountain range in the Pacific Northwest of North America
 Cascades Rapids or "Cascade Falls", an area of rapids in the Columbia River in Oregon
 Cascade Volcanoes, a geological grouping of volcanoes, including those in the Cascade Range and some in the Coast Mountains
 Fort Cascades, a US Army fort in what is now Washington state (1855-1861)
 "The Cascades", a series of ten waterfalls on Monkman Creek in the Northern Rockies of British Columbia, Canada, including Monkman Falls

Elsewhere
 Cascades, Hong Kong, a housing estate
 Cascades, Tasmania, Australia, a suburb of Hobart
 Cascades Region, a region in Burkina Faso
 Yerevan Cascade, a huge limestone stairway in Yerevan, Armenia

Businesses
 Cascades (company), a paper and packaging company headquartered in Quebec, Canada
 Cascades Shopping Centre, Portsmouth, UK

Music

Groups
 Ronnie & the Hi-Lites, a group originally called The Cascades
 Seattle Cascades Drum and Bugle Corps, a DCI-affiliated junior drum and bugle corps
 The Cascades (band), a 1960s pop group

Albums and songs
 Cascades (EP), by Jean-Michel Blais and CFCF
 Cascades (Marilyn Crispell album), and title track, 1995
 "Cascades", a song by Metric from Pagans in Vegas
 "Cascades: I'm not your lover", a song from English rock band Deep Purple
 "The Cascades" (rag), a 1904 ragtime composition by Scott Joplin
 "The Cascades", a Fleet Foxes song on Helplessness Blues (2011)

Rail transportation
 Amtrak Cascades, a US passenger train route
 Cascades MAX Station, a light rail station, Portland, Oregon, US
 Cascades Railroad, a defunct short railroad in Washington state, US

Other uses
Cascades, Isle of Dogs, a building in London, England
 Cascades FC, a Tasmanian soccer club from 1931 to 1936
 Cascades Female Factory, a former Australian workhouse for female convicts in Hobart, Tasmania
 Oregon State University Cascades Campus, a branch campus in Bend, Oregon, US
 The Cascades, a terminus of the Los Angeles Aqueduct, US

See also
 Cascade (disambiguation)